

Championships

1992 Olympics
Men: United States of America 117, Croatia 85
Women: Unified Team 76, China 66

Professional
Men
1992 NBA Finals:  Chicago Bulls over the Portland Trail Blazers 4–2.  MVP:  Michael Jordan
1992 NBA Playoffs
1991–92 NBA season
1992 NBA draft
1992 NBA All-Star Game
Eurobasket:  None.
Women
Eurobasket Women: None

College
Men
NCAA
Division I: Duke 71, Michigan 51
NIT: Virginia 81, Notre Dame 76
Division II:  100,  75
Division III:  62,  49
NAIA
Division I  82,  73 OT
Division II  85,  79 OT
NJCAA
Division I Three Rivers Community College (MO) 78, Butler Community College (KS) 77
Division II Owens Technical College (OH) 105, Iowa Lakes Community College (IA) 86
Division III Sullivan County Community College 101,	Eastfield College 76
Women
NCAA
Division I:   78, Western Kentucky 62
Division II:  65,  63
Division III:  79,  75
NAIA
Division I:  84,  (Texas) 68
Division II:  73,  56
NJCAA
Division I Louisburg College 104, Central Florida Community College 89
Division II Illinois Central College 89, Lansing Community College 72
Division III Becker College, Mass. 87, Ocean County College 54

Awards and honors

Professional
Men
NBA Most Valuable Player Award:   Michael Jordan
NBA Rookie of the Year Award:  Larry Johnson, Charlotte Hornets
NBA Defensive Player of the Year Award:  David Robinson, San Antonio Spurs
NBA Coach of the Year Award: Don Nelson, Golden State Warriors

Collegiate 
 Men
John R. Wooden Award: Christian Laettner, Duke
Naismith College Coach of the Year: Mike Krzyzewski, Duke
Frances Pomeroy Naismith Award: Tony Bennett, Green Bay
Associated Press College Basketball Player of the Year: Christian Laettner, Duke
NCAA basketball tournament Most Outstanding Player: Donald Williams, North Carolina
USBWA National Freshman of the Year: Chris Webber, Michigan
Associated Press College Basketball Coach of the Year: Roy Williams, Kansas
Naismith Outstanding Contribution to Basketball: John McLendon
 Women
Naismith College Player of the Year: Dawn Staley, Virginia
Naismith College Coach of the Year: Chris Weller, Maryland
Wade Trophy: Susan Robinson, Penn State
Frances Pomeroy Naismith Award: Rosemary Kosiorek, West Virginia
NCAA basketball tournament Most Outstanding Player: Molly Goodenbour, Stanford
Carol Eckman Award: Jill Hutchison, Illinois State University

Naismith Memorial Basketball Hall of Fame
Class of 1992:
Sergei Belov
Lou Carnesecca
Lusia Harris-Stewart
Connie Hawkins
Bob Lanier
Al McGuire
Jack Ramsay
Nera White
Phil Woolpert

Movies
Final Shot: The Hank Gathers Story
White Men Can't Jump

Births

Deaths
February 5 — Bill Wheatley, 82, American Olympic gold medalist (1936).
June 26 — Evan Male, 78, American college coach (Virginia).
July 7 — Vernon Smith, 33, American CBA and Liga ACB player.
August 3 — Eddie Riska, 72, American NBL player (Oshkosh All-Stars).
August 19 — Stretch Murphy, 85, All-American college player (Purdue).
December 11 — Moose Krause, 79, All-American college player and coach (Notre Dame).

References